The Pig Who Saved the World is the sequel to The Pig Scrolls, both of which were written by Paul Shipton. It is set in Ancient Greece and makes references to Greek mythology concerning their gods and heroes. It was first published in 2006.

The main character is Gryllus, a talking pig who has just finished saving the world from utter chaos, when he decides he wants to become human once more. In order to do this, he has to set out to find Circe, the witch who turned him into a pig in the first place, and ask her to change him back. Sibyl, the ex-priestess, and Homer, the soon to be epic poet, come along for the ride.

The Pig Who Saved the World won the Nestlé Bronze Award in 2006.

References

2006 British novels
Children's historical novels
British children's novels
British young adult novels
British comedy novels
Novels set in ancient Greece
Classical mythology in popular culture
Pigs in literature
Greek and Roman deities in fiction
2006 children's books
Puffin Books books